The Best American Poetry 1991, a volume in The Best American Poetry series, was edited by David Lehman and by guest editor Mark Strand.

Poets and poems included

Most-represented publications in this volume
Only one poem per poet is represented in any regular volume in the series, but some publications are represented multiple times among the 75 poems picked by the guest editor (Mark Strand, this year).

In order of frequency, these are the publications most represented this year:

See also
 1991 in poetry

Notes

External links
 Web page for contents of the book, with links to each publication where the poems originally appeared

Best American Poetry series
1991 poetry books
American poetry anthologies